Maureen Feeney is an American politician who served on the Boston City Council and was the City Clerk of Boston, Massachusetts.

City Council
From 1994 to 2011 she represented Dorchester on the Boston City Council. She served as City Council president from 2007 to 2008. Feeney did not run for reelection in 2011 and resigned on November 10, 2011, before her final term was complete. Her resignation allowed her to seek the position of city clerk, as state conflict of interest law required that she be out of office for a minimum of 30 days before she could be appointed.

City Clerk
On December 21, 2011, Feeney was named city clerk by the city council. Ten councilors voted in favor of Feeney, Charles Yancey voted for Natalie Carithers, and Tito Jackson voted present to show his displeasure with the process of choosing the new clerk. She took office the following month. She retired in 2022.

Other races
In 1996, Feeney was a candidate for state representative in the 13th Suffolk District, but dropped out of the race. In 1997, she lost the Democratic nomination for the Massachusetts Senate seat in the Suffolk and Norfolk District to Brian A. Joyce by less than 400 votes.

References

Further reading
 John C. Drake. Boston City Council in transition, turmoil: Turner case clouds end of presidency. Boston Globe, November 27, 2008.

Boston city clerks
Boston City Council members
Dorchester, Boston
Year of birth missing (living people)
Living people
Women city councillors in Massachusetts
Massachusetts Democrats